Per Anders "Anton" Thidholm (born 4 April 1954 in Härnösand) is a Swedish curler and curling coach, a two-time  and a 1981 Swedish men's curling champion.

He participated in the demonstration event at the 1988 Winter Olympics, when the Swedish team finished at fifth place.

In 1978 he was inducted into the Swedish Curling Hall of Fame.

Teams

Record as a coach of national teams

References

External links

Living people
1954 births
People from Härnösand
Swedish male curlers
Swedish curling champions
Curlers at the 1988 Winter Olympics
Olympic curlers of Sweden
Swedish curling coaches
Sportspeople from Västernorrland County
20th-century Swedish people